Sterley Stanley (born June 24, 1966) is an American politician and businessman serving as a member of the New Jersey General Assembly from the 18th district. He assumed office on January 27, 2021, succeeding Nancy Pinkin.

Early life 
Born in India, Stanley was raised in Brooklyn, where he graduated from Xaverian High School in 1984. He later relocated to East Brunswick, New Jersey.

Career 
Prior to entering politics, he worked as an insurance broker and a financial services representative for Mass Mutual New Jersey. He was also a sales representative for MetLife. Stanley served as a member of the East Brunswick Town Council from 2017 to 2021.

New Jersey General Assembly 
He was chosen by a special convention of Democratic Party county committee members to the New Jersey General Assembly and assumed office on January 27, 2021, succeeding Nancy Pinkin, who had resigned from office to become the County Clerk of Middlesex County. Stanley is the first legislator of South Asian descent to represent his district.

District 18 
Each of the 40 districts in the New Jersey Legislature has one representative in the New Jersey Senate and two members in the New Jersey General Assembly. The representatives from the 18th District for the 2022—23 Legislative Session are:
 Senator Patrick J. Diegnan (D)
 Assemblyman Robert Karabinchak (D)
 Assemblyman Sterley Stanley (D)

See also 
 Indians in the New York City metropolitan area

References

External links
Legislative webpage

Living people
1966 births
Democratic Party members of the New Jersey General Assembly
New Jersey city council members
People from East Brunswick, New Jersey
Politicians from Middlesex County, New Jersey
21st-century American politicians
Indian emigrants to the United States
American politicians of Indian descent
People from Brooklyn